Import and export or import/export may refer to:

 Import and export of goods 
 International trade
 Import/export regulations, trade regulations of such goods
 Import/export tariffs, taxes on the trade in such goods
 Import and export of data in computing, the moving of data between applications
 Import and export of formats, data conversion from one file type to another
 Import/Export, a 2007 Austrian film
 An import statement used as a form or analog of an include directive in some programming languages
 Import–export (logic), a form of deductive argument in classical logic